The Trans Eastern Kedah Interland Highway (TEKIH) is a new toll-free highway in the state of Kedah, Malaysia.

At most sections, the highest was built under the JKR R5 road standard, allowing maximum speed limit of up to 90 km/h.

List of junctions

Highways in Malaysia
Malaysian Federal Roads